The Homewood is a modernist house in Esher, Surrey, England. Designed by architect Patrick Gwynne for his parents, The Homewood was given by Gwynne to the National Trust in 1999.

Origins
The family demolished the original rambling Victorian house called "Homewood", to make way for the house on stilts (pilotis) their son Patrick Gwynne would design and build to replace it, at the age of 24. The family sold off property in Wales to finance the project which cost £10,000 at the time, exceeding the original estimate.

Influences and structure
The Homewood was Gwynne's first house project and his lasting favourite. His influences included Le Corbusier and Mies van der Rohe, fathers of the modernist International Style that took hold in the 1920s. Like Le Corbusier and Frank Lloyd Wright before him, he designed everything including the furniture and fittings, even the grounds. But unlike Wright, he emphasised the grounds being arranged for the house rather than the house built for the grounds. He created two models of measurement used throughout to regulate proportions. The vertical model was 20 inches and multiples of this would delineate everything upright, for example, from window ledges, to window and ceiling heights. The horizontal model was four feet.

The new Homewood was structured so that bedrooms and offices were on one side and on the other, living and utility areas. At one end is the servants' quarters. Below are the car spaces and entrance.

Style
The elevated house with its lean modernist lines and industrial materials, is open plan with the spaces signified by furniture arrangement. It is spare, spacious and functional, yet comfortable. The concrete interior staircase is lit by a sunken uplight. Décor includes signature wall papers, innovations such as mechanised blinds over the floor to ceiling windows, convertible work desks, multipurpose cabinets (some with interior lighting), concealed storage and bedroom ensuites. There were originally five bedrooms, later four, and the colour scheme is neutral ranging from cream or white, shades of brown to chocolate and black with some sky blue accessories. In contrast, there is one lavish bespoke glass chandelier on the landing. The Homewood served as Gwynne's living portfolio to clients and students, exhibiting his designs from architecture to furniture, finishes and fittings, as well as attention to detail and complete design control.

As post-War years meant no staff, Gwynne installed a pool and converted the servants' quarters to an entertainment/relaxation centre which relocated this function from the roof (rooftop entertaining being a 1930s custom that favoured flat roofs) to the grounds, making access easier for the purpose.

Since each member of the family had a car, the stilts provided space for four cars. The entrance was approached by driving in completely under cover. Gwynne's blue-green Aston Martin remains at The Homewood.

When Patrick, his sister and father enlisted or joined the war effort, the house was tenanted until they returned. Both parents died of natural causes before the end of World War II and did not survive to live in the final result. After his sister left the house because she married, Patrick lived alone in the house for 46 years. In his later years he lived in the former servants' quarters while working with the National Trust to restore it to the original.

After Gwynne’s death

Gwynne entered into discussions with the National Trust in 1993 but the negotiations were not concluded until 1999. When he gave the house to the Trust in 1999 it was on the basis that he had the right to live there until his death and that, when he died, a family would live in it and that it must be open to the public for one day a week for six months of the year. The Trust also agreed to undertake some repairs and renovations under his supervision. These commenced in 1999 and were ongoing at the time of his death in May 2003. After five rounds of interviews organised by the Trust, the house was offered in October 2007 to David Scott, Louise Cavanagh, and their daughter Isabella. The property has been featured in the ITV series Endeavour ("Rocket" episode) and Agatha Christie's Marple (Endless Night), both shown in 2013. It is open to the public on alternate Fridays and Saturdays from April to October.

Photo gallery

References
National Trust: National Treasures : Homewood/ Willow Road — 2005 TV Documentary showing fine homes across Britain and Northern Ireland, shown ABC TV January 25, 2006

External links
The Homewood information at the National Trust
National Trust

Details from listed building database

Grade II listed buildings in Surrey
Modernist architecture in England
National Trust properties in Surrey
Historic house museums in Surrey